Kalateh-ye Jafar (also Romanized as Kalāteh-ye Jaʿfar) is a village in Radkan Rural District, in the Central District of Chenaran County, Razavi Khorasan Province, Iran. At the 2006 census, its population was 60, in 14 families.

References 

Populated places in Chenaran County